Jon Harlan Roberts is an American historian currently serving as the Tomorrow Foundation Professor of History at Boston University.

Education
BA, University of Missouri, 1969
MA, Harvard University, 1970
PhD, Harvard University, 1980

Selected publications
Darwinism and the Divine in America: Protestant Intellectuals and Organic Evolution, 1859-1900.‎ (University of Wisconsin, 1988)
Science Without God?: Rethinking the History of Scientific Naturalism. (Oxford, 2018)
The Sacred and the Secular University. (Princeton University, 2021)

References

External links
 Curriculum vitae

21st-century American historians
21st-century American male writers
American historians of science
Boston University faculty
Living people
Harvard University alumni
Harvard University faculty
Historians of Christianity
Historians of the United States
Intellectual historians
University of Missouri alumni
University of Wisconsin–Stevens Point faculty
Year of birth missing (living people)
American male non-fiction writers